The city of Ottawa, Canada held municipal elections on January 7, 1924 to elect members of the 1924 Ottawa City Council. It was the first of two municipal elections held in the 1924 calendar year, as the 1925 council was elected in December 1924.

Mayor of Ottawa

Plebiscite
There was a vote on the bylaw to sanction the agreement with the Ottawa Electric Railway Company. The bylaw would do away with ticket fares, replacing them with a straight five cent fare. It also means the company can begin construction on the Laurier Avenue, Bank to Elgin line and the Ottawa East line.

Ottawa Board of Control
(4 elected)

Ottawa City Council
(2 elected from each ward)

References
'The Ottawa Evening Citizen', Jan 8, 1924

Municipal elections in Ottawa
1924 elections in Canada
1920s in Ottawa
1924 in Ontario